Topallar is a village in the Musabeyli District, Kilis Province, Turkey. The village had a population of 235 in 2022.

References

Villages in Musabeyli District